Manuel Velázquez Villaverde (24 January 1943 – 15 January 2016) was a Spanish footballer who played as a central midfielder.

Club career
Born in Madrid, Velázquez spent all of his 12 years in La Liga with Real Madrid. After three seasons on loan, to Rayo Vallecano and CD Málaga, helping the latter promote from Segunda División in 1965, he went on to appear in 402 competitive games for his main club whilst scoring 59 goals, winning six national championships, three Copa del Rey trophies and the 1965–66 edition of the European Cup, where he was featured in the final against FK Partizan.

In the 1967–68 campaign, Velázquez netted a career-best ten goals from 28 appearances – including a hat-trick in a 9–1 home rout of Real Sociedad– conquering the second of his domestic leagues. He ended his career at the age of 35, after six months in the North American Soccer League with Toronto Metros-Croatia.

International career
Velázquez earned ten caps for the Spain national team in eight years. He made his debut on 1 February 1967, in a 0–0 away draw in Turkey for the UEFA Euro 1968 qualifiers.

Death
Velázquez died on 15 January 2016 in Fuengirola, Andalusia. He was 72 years old.

References

External links

1943 births
2016 deaths
Footballers from Madrid
Spanish footballers
Association football midfielders
La Liga players
Segunda División players
Real Madrid CF players
Rayo Vallecano players
CD Málaga footballers
North American Soccer League (1968–1984) players
Toronto Blizzard (1971–1984) players
UEFA Champions League winning players
Spain amateur international footballers
Spain international footballers
Competitors at the 1963 Mediterranean Games
Mediterranean Games medalists in football
Mediterranean Games bronze medalists for Spain
Spanish expatriate footballers
Expatriate soccer players in Canada
Spanish expatriate sportspeople in Canada